Boeuf Township is an inactive township in Gasconade County, in the U.S. state of Missouri.

Boeuf Township most likely takes its name from Boeuf Creek.

References

Townships in Missouri
Townships in Gasconade County, Missouri